Lake Laka is located in the Czech part of the Šumava mountains. It is the highest and smallest lake in that area with a position of 1,096 metres above sea level and an area of 2.7ha. The lake is a part of the so-called glacial lakes of which there are five in Czech Republic and three in Germany.

References

Lakes of the Czech Republic
Geography of the Plzeň Region
Bohemian Forest
Vltava basin